Rolando Ortiz (born 20 February 1970) is a former Colombian mountain runner who won one World Mountain Running Championships (2006).

References

External links
 Rolando Ortiz profile at Association of Road Racing Statisticians

1970 births
Living people
Place of birth missing (living people)
Colombian mountain runners
Colombian male long-distance runners
World Mountain Running Championships winners